This list of dukes and grand dukes of Mecklenburg dates from the origins of the German princely state of Mecklenburg's royal house in the High Middle Ages to the monarchy's abolition at the end of World War I. Strictly speaking, Mecklenburg's princely dynasty was descended linearly from the princes (or kings) of a Slavic tribe, the Obotrites, and had its original residence in a castle (Mecklenburg) in Dorf Mecklenburg (Mikelenburg) close to Wismar. As part of a feudal union under German law from 1160—at first under the Saxons—Mecklenburg was granted imperial immediacy in 1348 and its princely rulers styled Dukes of Mecklenburg. Despite several partitions, Mecklenburg remained an integral state until the end of the monarchy. The First Partition of Mecklenburg came in 1234, causing the principality to lose land. Thus arose the partial principalities (lordships) of Werle, Parchim-Richenberg, Rostock and Mecklenburg. In modern times it was divided into the two (partial) duchies of Mecklenburg-Schwerin (I) and Mecklenburg-Stargard (1348–1471), Mecklenburg-Schwerin (II) and Mecklenburg-Güstrow (1555–1695), and with the Treaty of Hamburg (1701) into Mecklenburg-Schwerin (III) and Mecklenburg-Strelitz. However, the dynasty always retained feudal rights to the entire fief and the rulers of both parts of the country always had identical titles, which led to diplomatic confusion.

The Congress of Vienna in 1815 granted the ruling dukes an adjustment in rank with the title Grand Duke of Mecklenburg and the personal style Royal Highness. Both parts of the country were henceforth designated Grand Duchies. Besides both rulers, each heir to the throne, their respective wives and all other members of the princely family used the title of Duke (or Duchess) of Mecklenburg, notwithstanding the customary name of Princes and Princesses. The rulers of Mecklenburg were styled Duke of (from 1815 Grand Duke of) Mecklenburg, Prince of the Wends, Schwerin and Ratzeburg, and Count of Schwerin, Lord of the Lands of Rostock and Stargard (Herzog zu / Großherzog von Mecklenburg, Fürst zu Wenden, Schwerin und Ratzeburg, auch Graf zu Schwerin, der Lande Rostock und Stargard Herr).

At the end of the monarchy in 1918, the House of Mecklenburg was the oldest ruling princely dynasty in Germany. During the Weimar Republic, the former princely title was turned into a commoner's surname, Herzog zu Mecklenburg ("Duke of Mecklenburg").

The Land of the Obotrites

As allies of the Carolingian kings and the empire of their Ottonian successors, the Obotrites fought from 808 to 1200 against the kings of Denmark, who wished to rule the Baltic region independently of the empire. When opportunities arose, for instance upon the death of an emperor, they would seek to seize power; and in 983 Hamburg was destroyed by the Obotrites under their king, Mstivoj. At times they levied tribute from the Danes and Saxons. Under the leadership of Niklot, they resisted a Christian assault during the Wendish Crusade.

German missionaries such as Vicelinus converted the Obotrites to Christianity. In 1170 they acknowledged the suzerainty of the Holy Roman Empire, leading to Germanisation and assimilation over the following centuries. The ruling clan of the Obotrites kept its power throughout the Germanisation and ruled their country (except of a short interruption in Thirty Years' War) as House of Mecklenburg until the end of monarchies in Germany in November Revolution 1918.

List of Obotrite leaders

The rulers of Obotrite lands were later the Dukes and Grand Dukes of Mecklenburg.

The Saxon suzerainty and the land of Mecklenburg

From the 7th through the 12th centuries, the area of Mecklenburg was taken over by Western Slavic peoples, most notably the Obotrites and other tribes that Frankish sources referred to as "Wends". The 11th century founder of the Mecklenburgian dynasty of Dukes and later Grand Dukes, which lasted until 1918, was Nyklot of the Obotrites.

In the late 12th century, Henry the Lion, Duke of the Saxons, conquered the region, subjugated its local lords, and Christianized its people, in a precursor to the Northern Crusades.  From 12th to 14th century, large numbers of Germans and Flemings settled the area (Ostsiedlung), importing German law and improved agricultural techniques. The Wends who survived all warfare and devastation of the centuries before, including invasions of and expeditions into Saxony, Denmark and Liutizic areas as well as internal conflicts, were assimilated in the centuries thereafter.  However, elements of certain names and words used in Mecklenburg speak to the lingering Slavic influence.  An example would be the city of Schwerin, which was originally called Zuarin in Slavic.  Another example is the town of Bresegard, the 'gard' portion of the town name deriving from the Slavic word 'grad', meaning city or town.

Partitions of Mecklenburg

Like many German territories, Mecklenburg was sometimes partitioned and re-partitioned among different members of the ruling dynasty. The division started in 1227.

Partition of 1227

In 1227, Henry Borwin II divided his lands of Mecklenburg among his sons: John received the area called Mecklenburg; Nicholas received Werle; Henry Borwin III Rostock and Pribislaus Parchim-Rinchenberg. In 1256, the latter showed incapacity for government and his brothers deposed him, dividing his lands among themselves.

In 1314 the land of Nicholas the Child of Rostock died without heirs; his lands were annexed to Mecklenburg-Mecklenburg.

In 1348 Mecklenburg-Mecklenburg and its possessions were elevated as an unified duchy, with seat at Schwerin. The line of Mecklenburg-Mecklenburg then took the seat's name for their branch: from 1348, when elevated, the line of Mecklenburg-Mecklenburg changed to Mecklenburg-Schwerin.

In 1352 the duchy of Mecklenburg-Schwerin was again divided: from Schwerin grew a new line of dukes, called Mecklenburg-Stargard.

In 1436 the Werle line, and in 1471 the Stargard line were annexed to Mecklenburg-Schwerin, reuniting all the lands of Mecklenburg.

Partition of 1520

In 1520 the united Mecklenburg, bearing the name Mecklenburg-Schwerin, was redivided. The line of Mecklenburg-Güstrow splits off from the elder line of Mecklenburg-Schwerin. In 1695 Mecklenburg-Schwerin-Güstrow was reabsorbed in Mecklenburg, reuniting the duchy one more time.

Partition of 1701

In 1701 the united Mecklenburg, bearing the name Mecklenburg-Schwerin, was redivided. The line of Mecklenburg-Strelitz splits off from the elder line of Mecklenburg-Schwerin. In 1918, at the end of World War I, the monarchy was abolished, with the duchy still divided.

Rulers of Mecklenburg: the House of Mecklenburg

Partitions of Mecklenburg under Mecklenburg rule

Table of rulers
(Note: The current numbering system established for the rulers of Mecklenburg is based in the following: Mecklenburg, Mecklenburg-Schwerin, Mecklenburg-Gustrow and Mecklenburg-Strelitz form one group of a single numbering. The other parts of Mecklenburg (Parchim, Werle, Rostock and Mecklenburg-Stargard) have their own and independent numberings for their rulers.)

Notes

Bibliography
 Friedrich Wigger: Stammtafeln des Großherzoglichen Hauses von Meklenburg. In: Jahrbücher des Vereins für Mecklenburgische Geschichte und Altertumskunde 50 (1885), p. 111ff. (Digitalised)

External links
 
 
  Fürsten und Gutsherren sorgten für Park- und Schlösserfluten, Mecklenburg-Pomerania Tourism Agency
  "Von der Reformation bis heute" ("From the Reformation until Today"), Evangelical Lutheran Church of Mecklenburg-Pomerania

Lists of monarchs

 
 
 
 
 
 
Lists of office-holders in Germany

hu:Mecklenburg#Mecklenburgi uralkodók